Vladimir Anzulović (born 6 February 1978) is a Croatian professional basketball coach and former player

Playing career 
Anzulović played pro basketball as a point guard from 1996 to 2010.

For the senior Croatia national team he played total 7 games (2 friendly, 5 officially). Anzulović played five official games at FIBA EuroBasket 2003 qualification, scoring total 22 points.

Coaching career 
Anzulović firstly worked in Slovenia. In August 2016, he was hired as the head coach for Šibenik. In his inaugural season at the club, Šibenik reached semifinals of the domestic championship, while in the next season, they managed to reach quarterfinals, where Split defeat them. On 10 May 2018, his contract expired, and he left the club. 

On 29 May 2018, he was hired as the head coach for Split, but following a poor performance in the ABA League, he was sacked on 5 March 2019. In the summer of 2019, he coached the Croatia national team at the Universiade.

On 7 November 2019, Anzulović replaced Simon Petrov as the head coach of the Slovenian team Krka. On 17 March 2021, Krka parted ways with him.

On 23 October 2021, Zadar hired Anzulović as their new head coach. He left after one season.

In July 2022, Anzulović was hired as the head coach of Úrvalsdeild karla club Tindastóll. He left the team in January 2023, with the team in 7th place with 6 wins in 12 games.

Personal life
His older brother Dražen is also a basketball coach.

References

External links
Profile at Eurobasket.com

1978 births
Living people
ABA League players
Croatian basketball coaches
Croatian expatriate sportspeople in Slovenia
Croatian men's basketball players
KK Split coaches
KK Zadar coaches
Point guards
Basketball players from Zagreb
KK Zrinjevac players
KK Zagreb players
KK Krka coaches
KK Krka players
KK Włocławek players
Szolnoki Olaj KK players
KK Dubrava players
Debreceni EAC (basketball) players
Iraklis Thessaloniki B.C. players
KK Zadar players
KK Kvarner players
RBC Pepinster players
KD Hopsi Polzela players
Ungmennafélagið Tindastóll men's basketball coaches
Úrvalsdeild karla (basketball) coaches